Ricardo Belmonte (born 20 June 1965) is a Bolivian judoka. He competed in the men's extra-lightweight event at the 1988 Summer Olympics.

References

1965 births
Living people
Bolivian male judoka
Olympic judoka of Bolivia
Judoka at the 1988 Summer Olympics
Place of birth missing (living people)